The Escravos River is a river in southern Nigeria. "Escravos" is a Portuguese word meaning "slaves" and the area was one of the main conduits for slave trade between Nigeria and the United States in the 18th century. Chevron, a major US oil company, has its main Nigerian oil production facility at the mouth of the Escravos River.

References

Rivers of Nigeria
Distributaries of the Niger River